José Miguel Pérez Pérez (8 December 1896 – 4 September 1936) was a Canarian politician. He was General Secretary of the Central Committee of the Communist Party of Cuba in 1925.

References 

1896 births
1936 deaths
20th-century Spanish politicians
History of Cuba
Politicians from the Canary Islands
Spanish Civil War in the Canary Islands
Victims of the White Terror (Spain)
Communist Party of Spain politicians

People executed by Francoist Spain
Politicians killed in the Spanish Civil War
People from La Palma